Unity Theatre was a theatre club formed in 1936, and initially based in St Judes Hall, Britannia Street, Somers Town, London NW1. In 1937, it moved to a former chapel in Goldington Street, also in Somers Town, an area which is part of the present day London Borough of Camden. Although the theatre was destroyed by fire in 1975, productions continued sporadically until 1994, when the site was sold for social housing. Unity Mews is today on the site and a bronze plaque commemorates the theatre. It had links to the Left Book Club Theatre Guild and the Communist Party of Great Britain. By the end of the theatre's first decade, it had spawned 250 branches throughout Britain.

History
The theatre grew from the Workers' Theatre Movement, formed in the East End of London. This was an attempt to bring contemporary social and political issues to a working class audience; it introduced plays by, about and for workers. The company used agitprop theatre techniques to highlight the suffering of unemployment and hunger marches in the Great Depression and to challenge the rise of Nazism in Germany and Oswald Mosley's British Union of Fascists. They sought to show the republican struggle in Spain.

The company was notable for pioneering new dramatic forms, such as company-devised documentary pieces, 'Living Newspapers' and satirical pantomimes, including Babes in the Wood (whose cast included Bill Owen, Mark Cheney, Vida Hope, Alfie Bass and Una Brandon-Jones). Ann Davies appeared as Robin Hood (the Principal Boy) in a political version of the pantomime Babes in the Wood which lampooned Neville Chamberlain's appeasement policy and had her as saviour in a Russian uniform. The production ran for seven months and Montagu Slater credited the play with making real political change. 

The theatre also created Plant In The Sun (starring Paul Robeson, along with Alfie Bass). The improvisational technique brought them into conflict with the Lord Chamberlain's Office, who retained the right to approve theatre scripts under the Theatres Act 1843. Nevertheless, the company managed to present important works throughout the 1930s, and audiences, suspicious of politics as usual, and tired of the light and fluffy entertainments designed for the upper classes, responded. There was a ban on theatre at the outbreak of war, but once lifted, the theatre remained active throughout World War II. The company also provided groups of entertainers to tour factories and air-raid shelters.

In addition, there was an associated Unity Theatre School. Unity was a volunteer theatre, neither fully amateur, nor professional (apart from a short-lived professional company founded in 1946 by Ted Willis) and loosely linked to a national network. By the outbreak of World War II, there were over 250 branches throughout the country. The end of theatrical censorship in 1968 meant that mainstream theatre could perform more radical plays, and the movement fell into decline, with the London theatre closing after a fire in 1975.

According to The New York Times, "...it finally expired in 1983 because it represented a spirit of old-fashioned opposition and could not find its place in a more strident and increasingly prosperous age."  Attempts were made to revive the theatre in the late 1980s and early 1990s, and for a while a studio theatre was created in Somers Town (in the space now occupied by Camden People's Theatre), but today, whilst the Unity Theatre Trust continues in London, only the Unity Theatre, Liverpool retains an active theatre under the Unity Theatre name. However, Unity Theatre Cardiff has been in continuous existence since its formation in 1942.  The company left the Unity Theatre movement in 1948, and was renamed Everyman Theatre Cardiff. Despite leaving the movement, the company continues to adhere to much of the Unity ethos, and remains neither fully amateur nor professional.

Notable writers and actors
Unity introduced new writers, both British and international, presenting Señora Carrara's Rifles (1938), the first Brecht play in Britain and premières of Clifford Odets's Waiting for Lefty, Seán O'Casey's The Star Turns Red (1940), Strike and The Musical Adventures of Mr. Pickwick by Arnold Hinchliffe, and Jean-Paul Sartre's Nekrassov (1956). The theatre also helped popularise the plays of Maxim Gorky.

Notable actors associated with Unity Theatre have included Lionel Bart, Alfie Bass, Una Brandon-Jones, Michael Gambon, Julian Glover, Jack Grossman, Harry Landis, Michael Redgrave, Herbert Lom, Vida Hope, Bob Hoskins, David Kossoff, Warren Mitchell, Bill Owen, who was then known as Bill Rowbotham, Eric Paice, Ted Willis and Roger Woddis. Bart's earliest contributions were lyrics for the revue Turn It Up. Bart also wrote the lyrics for an agitprop version of Cinderella and also wrote a revue called Peacemeal and a play called Wally Pone for the group. During the war, Ann Davies became the theatre's first woman president.

See also
Jack Firestein
Heinz Bernard (theatre manager 1956 - 1964)

References

Further reading
Colin Chambers The story of Unity Theatre

External links
Everyman Theatre Cardiff
Everyman Open Air Theatre Festival
New York Times article from 28 January 1990
Information about the history of Unity Theatre
Review of a film about the theatre
Unity Theatre Records, 1931-1960 at Southern Illinois University Carbondale, Special Collections Research Center
The records of the Unity Theatre Company are held by the Victoria and Albert Museum Theatre and Performance Department.

Unity Theatre
Unity Theatre
Theatres completed in 1936